I Can See Your Voice is a Belgian Dutch-language television mystery music game show series based on the South Korean programme of the same name in the Flemish community. Since its premiere on 26 March 2022, it has aired two seasons on VTM.

Gameplay

Format
Presented with a group of seven "mystery singers" identified only by their occupation, a guest artist and a group of two contestants must attempt to eliminate bad singers from the group without ever hearing them sing, assisted by clues and a celebrity panel over the course of five rounds. At the end of the game, the last remaining mystery singer is revealed as either good or bad by means of a duet between them and one of the guest artists.

Rewards
If the singer is good, the contestants win ; if the singer is bad, the same amount is given to the bad singer instead.

Rounds
Each episode presents the guest artist and contestants with seven people whose identities and singing voices are kept concealed until they are eliminated to perform on the "stage of truth" or remain in the end to perform the final duet.

Notes:

Production
DPG Media Belgium first announced the development of the series in March 2021, following the successful broadcasts of The Masked Singer. It is produced by Warner Bros. International Television Production; the staff team is managed by producers Suzy Fayoumi and Annelies Siebens.

Tapings for the programme took place at VTM Studios in Vilvoorde.

Broadcast
I Can See Your Voice debuted on 26 March 2022. During the first season broadcasts, the series has been already renewed for the second season that premiered on 2 September 2022.

Series overview

Episodes

Season 1 (2022)

Season 2 (2022)

Notes

References

I Can See Your Voice (Belgian game show)
2020s Belgian television series
2022 Belgian television series debuts
Flemish
Belgian television series based on South Korean television series
Dutch-language television shows
Flemish television shows
VTM (TV channel) original programming